The 2015 ACC Twenty20 Cup was an international cricket tournament that was held between 25 and 30 January 2015 in the United Arab Emirates. Oman won the round-robin tournament and qualified for the 2015 ICC World Twenty20 Qualifier, along with Afghanistan, Hong Kong, Nepal and UAE who did not play in this tournament as their T20I status had qualified them directly to the 2015 ICC World Twenty20 Qualifier to be held in Ireland and Scotland. The full members of the ACC (India, Pakistan, Sri Lanka and Bangladesh) automatically qualify for the 2016 ICC World Twenty20 tournament.

Squads

Points table 

Points Table:

Won - 2 points
Lost - 0 points
Tie or No Result- 1 points

Fixtures

Final standing

Statistics

Most runs
The top five run scorers (total runs) are included in this table.

Source: ESPNcricinfo

Most wickets

The top five wicket takers, ranked by wickets taken and then by bowling average, are listed in this table.

Source: ESPNcricinfo

See also
 2015 ICC World Twenty20 Qualifier

References

External links
 Series home at ESPN Cricinfo 

2016 ICC World Twenty20
ACC Twenty20 Cup
ACC Twenty20 Cup